Nicolás García may refer to:

 Nicolás García (taekwondo) (born 1988), Spanish taekwondo athlete
 Nicolás García (diver) (born 1995), Spanish diver
 Nicolas Garcia (footballer, born 1986), Colombian footballer
 Nicolás García (swimmer) (born 2002), Spanish swimmer
 Nicolás García (footballer, born 2000), Uruguayan footballer